Celtic started season 2004–05 looking to win the Scottish Premier League trophy  and retain the Scottish Cup. They also competed in the Scottish League Cup and entered the Champions League at the group stage.

In the race for the SPL title, Celtic recorded a win over city rivals Rangers. However, as the season drew to a close, with Rangers closely following, the club extended their lead at the top of the SPL table to two points as they lined up for the final game of the season. A win at Motherwell was required to seal the title.

With two minutes remaining on the clock, Celtic were leading 1–0, a result which would have handed them the league. However, Motherwell's Scott McDonald (who later signed for Celtic) netted two last-minute goals. Rangers defeated Hibernian 1–0 at Easter Road, thereby winning the league championship title and leaving Celtic in second position. Celtic ended the season one week later with a 1–0 win over Dundee United in the Scottish Cup Final, which was marked by fans as Martin O'Neill's final match as manager.

On 25 May 2005, O'Neill announced he would resign as manager of Celtic at the end of 2004–05 season along with first team coach Steve Walford and assistant manager John Robertson. It was widely reported that O'Neill decided to take time out of football in order to care for his ailing wife, who was ill with lymphoma.

Competitions
All results (home and away) list Celtic's goal tally first.

Key:
 SPL = Scottish Premier League
 SC = Scottish Cup
 SLC = Scottish League Cup
 CLF - Champions League Group F
 CL = Champions League Match
 F = Friendly match

Squad

Player statistics

Appearances and goals

List of squad players, including number of appearances by competition

|}

Team statistics

League table

Technical staff

Transfers
In:

Out:

See also
 List of Celtic F.C. seasons
James McLeod was released due to long term injury, ongoing Sciatic nerve problem due to dislocating herniated disc.

References 

2004-05
Scottish football clubs 2004–05 season